Bastilla is a genus of moths in the family Erebidae. The genus was described by Swinhoe in 1918.

Taxonomy
Most species in the genus were formerly placed in the genus Dysgonia.

Selected species

Bastilla absentimacula (Guenée, 1852)
Bastilla acuta (Moore, 1883)
Bastilla amygdalis (Moore, 1885)
Bastilla analis (Guenée, 1852)
Bastilla angularis (Boisduval, 1833)
Bastilla arcuata (Moore, 1877)
Bastilla arctotaenia (Guenée, 1852)
Bastilla axiniphora (Hampson, 1913)
Bastilla binatang Holloway & Miller, 2003
Bastilla circumsignata (Guenée, 1852)
Bastilla copidiphora (Hampson, 1913)
Bastilla crameri (Moore, 1885)
Bastilla cuneilineata (Warren, 1915)
Bastilla dentilinea (Bethune-Baker, 1906)
Bastilla derogans (Walker, 1858)
Bastilla dicoela (Turner, 1909)
Bastilla duplicata (Robinson, 1975)
Bastilla euryleuca (Prout, 1919)
Bastilla flavipurpurea (Holloway, 1976)
Bastilla flexilinea (Warren, 1915)
Bastilla fulvotaenia (Guenée, 1852)
Bastilla insularum (Orhant, 2002)
Bastilla joviana (Stoll, 1782)
Bastilla hamatilis (Guenée, 1852)
Bastilla koroensis (Robinson, 1969)
Bastilla lateritica (Holloway, 1979)
Bastilla marquesanus (Collenette, 1928)
Bastilla maturata (Walker, 1858)
Bastilla maturescens (Walker, 1858)
Bastilla missionarii (Hulstaert, 1924)
Bastilla myops (Guenée, 1852)
Bastilla nielseni Holloway & Miller, 2003
Bastilla palpalis (Walker, 1865)
Bastilla proxima (Hampson, 1902)
Bastilla praetermissa (Warren, 1913)
Bastilla solomonensis (Hampson, 1913)
Bastilla simillima (Guenée, 1852)
Bastilla subacuta (Bethune-Baker, 1906)
Bastilla tahitiensis (Orhant, 2002)
Bastilla vitiensis (Butler, 1886)

References

Holloway, J. D. & Miller, Scott E. (2003). "The composition, generic placement and host-plant relationships of the joviana-group in the Parallelia generic complex". Invertebrate Systematics. 17: 111–128.

 
Moth genera